The 2003 Supertaça Cândido de Oliveira was the 25th edition of the Supertaça Cândido de Oliveira, the annual Portuguese football season-opening match contested by the winners of the previous season's top league and cup competitions (or cup runner-up in case the league- and cup-winning club is the same). The match took place on the 10 August 2003 at the Estádio D. Afonso Henriques in Guimarães, and was contested between 2002–03 Primeira Liga and 2002–03 Taça de Portugal winners Porto, and cup runners-up União de Leiria.

Porto would defeat União de Leiria 1–0 with an illegal goal. A 53rd minute headed goal from midfielder Costinha was sufficient for the Dragões to defeat Os Lis and claim the Supertaça Cândido de Oliveira for a 13th time in their history.

Match

Details

References

Supertaça Cândido de Oliveira
2003–04 in Portuguese football
FC Porto matches
U.D. Leiria matches